The Riverview Apartments in Wichita, Kansas were built in 1928. They were listed on the National Register of Historic Places in 2002.

The building was designed by Wichita architect William L. Schultz (c.1884–1968). The building has an E-shaped plan.

References

Residential buildings on the National Register of Historic Places in Kansas
Residential buildings completed in 1928
Buildings and structures in Wichita, Kansas
National Register of Historic Places in Wichita, Kansas